Best of Toadies:  Live from Paradise is a live album by Toadies.  It was recorded at the Paradise Rock Club in Boston, MA, just prior to the band's breakup in 2001 and was released as a limited edition in March 2002 on Aezra Records/Orpheus Music.  It was re-released on July 13, 2004.  The album proclaims: "No overdubs.  Warts and all!"

Best of Toadies:  Live from Paradise is an enhanced CD featuring a short video about the band.

Track listing

Credits 
Todd Lewis - lead vocals and guitar
Lisa Umbarger - bass and backing vocals
Clark Vogeler - right guitar and backing vocals
Mark Reznicek - drum kit
Stewart Bennett - front-of-house
Edo Levi - monitors, drum tech, percussion
Brian Bunn - guitar tech
Sean Bailey - tour manager
Ethan Dussault - recorder
Team Vision - engineer, mixing, mastering
Jonathan Purvis - photos
Fabio Jafet - video production
Mark Falkin - legal representation

References

Toadies albums
2002 live albums